Michel Alladaye (born 1940) is a former Beninese politician. He was the foreign minister of Benin from 1972 to 1980.

References

1940 births
Living people
Foreign ministers of Benin
20th-century Beninese politicians
Date of birth missing (living people)
Place of birth missing (living people)